"I'm Not a Juvenile Delinquent" is a song written by George Goldner and performed by Frankie Lymon and The Teenagers. It reached #12 on the UK Singles Chart in 1957. The song was featured on their 1956 album, The Teenagers Featuring Frankie Lymon.

Other versions
The Amboy Dukes released a version of the song on their 1969 album, Migration.
Shakin' Stevens and the Sunsets released a version of the song on their 1971 album, I'm No J.D.
The Magnificent Mercury Brothers released a version of the song as the B-side to their 1976 single "Why Do Fools Fall in Love?"

In popular culture
The Teenagers' version was featured in the 1956 film Rock, Rock, Rock and was on the film's 50th anniversary soundtrack, as well as the 1972 film Pink Flamingos, and the 1993 movie This Boy's Life. It was also featured in the episode of The Young Ones titled "Bomb." It was also used in the 2010 video game Mafia II's "Joe's Adventures" DLC as part of the fictional Empire Central Radio station's song list.

References

Songs about teenagers
1956 songs
1956 singles
The Teenagers songs
The Amboy Dukes songs
Gee Records singles
Songs written by George Goldner